The Ministry of Justice is the government department entrusted with the supervision of the legal and judicial system of Greece. The incumbent minister is Konstantinos Tsiaras of New Democracy.

It was founded as the State Secretariat for Justice on 25 January 1833, and later known as the Ministry of Justice (Katharevousa: ,). It was renamed the Ministry of Justice, Transparency and Human Rights in October 2009 under George Papandreou, but was restored to its previous name in July 2019 by Kyriakos Mitsotakis.

Ministers for Justice (1974–2009)

Ministers for Justice, Transparency and Human Rights (2009–2019)

Minister for Justice (since July 2019)

External links
 

Government ministries of Greece
Lists of government ministers of Greece
Greece

1833 establishments in Greece
Ministries established in 1833